HMAS Murchison (K442/F442) was a Modified  or  of the Royal Australian Navy (RAN). The ship was laid down in 1943, but not commissioned until after the end of World War II. Murchison fought in the Korean War, was decommissioned in 1956, and sold for scrap in 1961.

Construction
Murchison was one of four Bay-class frigates constructed in Australia during World War II, being laid down by Evans Deakin & Company, Brisbane on 3 June 1943. She was launched on 31 October 1944, and commissioned on 17 December 1945. She was named for the Murchison River in Western Australia.

Operational history
Completed too late in the war to take part in the fighting, Murchison began her career by visiting Morotai, Ternate, and the Celebes for surveillance duties and War Graves Commission tasks, before sailing to Japan and joining the British Commonwealth Occupation Force. The frigate returned to Australia in May 1946.

Murchison later saw extensive operational service during the Korean War and was involved in the Naval Battle of Han River on 28–30 September 1951, during which she was heavily engaged by Chinese shore installations while conducting riverine operations. Four sailors were wounded in the encounter, while Murchison destroyed a number of Chinese gun positions. The frigate was awarded the battle honour "Korea 1951–52" for her actions during the war.

On 3 October 1952, Murchison was present of the Montebello Islands for the Operation Hurricane nuclear weapons test.

Fate
Murchison paid off on 31 January 1956 and she was sold for scrap on 21 September 1961.

Citations

References

External links

River-class frigates of the Royal Australian Navy
Ships built in Queensland
1944 ships